T.H.E. Cat was a US television action drama that aired on NBC Fridays from 9:30 p.m. to 10:00 p.m. during the 1966–1967 television season.

The series was co-sponsored by R.J. Reynolds (Winston) and Lever Brothers and was created by Harry Julian Fink.

Robert Loggia starred as the title character, Thomas Hewitt Edward Cat. The series preceded the 1968–1970 ABC television series It Takes a Thief, which was also about a cat burglar who uses his skills for good.

Synopsis
Out of the night comes a man who saves lives at the risk of his own. Once a circus performer, an aerialist who refused the net. Once a cat burglar, a master among jewel thieves. Now a professional bodyguard. Primitive... savage... in love with danger. The Cat!

The series' hero is a reformed thief who had served a prison term. Of Romani heritage, Cat is cast in the mold of famed private eye Peter Gunn. Like Gunn's waterfront bar Mother's, Cat operates out of Casa Del Gato (House of the Cat) in San Francisco, of which he is part owner. Thomas is a master of martial arts who uses his skills to stop antagonists in his pursuit of justice for the downtrodden. He always works on the side of the law, occasionally using his skills to benefit the local police. His police contact is Police Capt. McAllister, a man with one hand. R. G. Armstrong played McAllister in 12 episodes of the series. Cat is also a master gymnast and acrobatic artist who uses his skills to gain entry to places from which the police are barred by law.

Casting
Series star Robert Loggia had previously played a character called "the Cat" in the 1958–60 Walt Disney television miniseries The Nine Lives of Elfego Baca, in which Loggia played Baca, an Old West Mexican-American lawman whose nickname is "the Cat", a fact viewers were reminded each week in the series' theme song. The series ran for ten episodes and was recut into a feature movie.

After T.H.E. Cat, Loggia, an actor with a long history of film and television credits, went on to star in a number of high-profile Hollywood films, including An Officer and a Gentleman, Scarface, Sylvester Stallone's Over the Top, the Tom Hanks hit film Big, and the science fiction action film Independence Day. In 1985, Loggia was nominated for an Academy Award for Best Supporting Actor for his portrayal of crusty private detective Sam Ransom in the thriller Jagged Edge, and had the starring role in another NBC series, Mancuso, FBI, for which he was nominated for an Emmy in 1989.

Reception
Although T.H.E. Cat was popular among children and teens, the series fared poorly in the ratings. It was cancelled after a single season.

Episodes

Cast

 Robert Loggia as Thomas Hewitt Edward Cat
 R. G. Armstrong as Captain McAllister
 Robert Carricart as Pepe Cordoza

Guest stars: Chris Alcaide, Barbara Stuart, Steve Ihnat, Robert Duvall, Laura Devon, Yvonne Romain, Sorrell Booke, Diana Muldaur, Linda Cristal, Ted Jordan, Robert Sampson, Simon Scott and Fred Beir.

See also 
 The A-Team television series about a team of former military personnel who help those in need.
 It Takes a Thief television series about an ex-cat burglar released from prison to steal for the fictional government agency SIA (Secret Intelligence Agency)

References

External links
 
 
 T.H.E. Cat intro—YouTube Video
 T.H.E. Cat Pilot Episode Starring Robert Loggia—YouTube Video
 T.H.E. Cat Episode 3 "Payment Overdue" Starring Robert Loggia—YouTube Video              
 T.H.E. Cat Episode 6—Starring Robert Loggia—YouTube Video

1966 American television series debuts
1967 American television series endings
Espionage television series
Fictional representations of Romani people
Fictional secret agents and spies
Fictional vigilantes
NBC original programming
Television series by CBS Studios
Television shows set in San Francisco